Next Friday is a 2000 American stoner comedy film and the sequel to the 1995 film Friday. It is the first film to be produced by Ice Cube's film production company Cubevision. It was directed by Steve Carr and stars Ice Cube, Mike Epps, John Witherspoon, Tamala Jones, and Tommy "Tiny" Lister Jr. It is the second installment in the Friday series. Next Friday was theatrically released on January 12, 2000, grossing $59 million worldwide. The film has received generally negative reviews from critics.

A third film, titled Friday After Next, was released in November 2002. This film also received negative reviews.

Plot

After finding out Deebo escaped prison to get revenge on Craig, Willie decides it would be safer for Craig to move to Rancho Cucamonga to live with his uncle Elroy and cousin Day-Day, who had just won the lottery. Day-Day shows Craig around the house and neighborhood. Day-Day explains to Craig that after winning the lottery, all of the taxes and fees that were taken out only left them enough to buy their house and Day-Day's car. A notice arrives informing them that their house could face repossession.

Later, Craig visits Day-Day at work, a record shop. Day-Day hides from his pregnant ex D'Wana and her little sister Baby D who constantly stalk and harass him saying that he is the baby's father. Day-Day's boss Pinky arrives at the store finding it locked. While Day-Day and his co-worker Roach are in the back, a scuffle between Craig and Pinky ensues in which Pinky mistakes him for a robber, while Craig tries to explain that he is Day-Day’s cousin. Pinky then fires Day-Day and Roach.

Craig, Day-Day, and Roach try to figure out how to keep the house. Craig remembers seeing their neighbors, a trio of gang member brothers known as "the Jokers", who live with their sister Karla carrying a hydraulic pump. Suspecting that it may be hiding cash, Craig convinces Day-Day and Roach to help him get inside the Jokers' house and steal the pump.

Later that night, Roach drugs the Jokers' Bull Terrier Chico with Cannabis to keep him distracted while Craig sneaks into the Jokers' house. Craig locates the pump finding cash is hidden inside and taking some for himself. He escapes out of a window. Panicking after the eldest Joker closes the window (the way Craig got into the house), Day-Day and Roach knock on the Jokers' door as a diversion for Craig to escape. After discovering the money from the pump is missing, The Jokers take Day-Day and Roach hostage and tie them up with duct tape.

Willie returns to the neighborhood while unknowingly hauling Deebo and his brother Tyrone in his truck, who snuck in earlier. Craig returns to Elroy's house only to find Willie and Elroy waiting for him. Craig, Willie, and Elroy decide to head the Jokers' house to rescue Day Day and Roach with Elroy's girlfriend Suga saying she will call the police if they aren’t back in ten minutes.

The trio sneaks into the Jokers' backyard. Joker sends Baby Joker and Lil' Joker to get a chainsaw from the toolshed. Willie knocks Baby Joker with a 2x4 and Elroy tackles Lil' Joker. Willie ties the younger Jokers up and puts them in the shed.

Joker goes to look for his brothers and finds Elroy on the ground due to his back giving out after tackling Lil' Joker. Craig then engages him in a fight. As Craig and Joker fight, Elroy unties Day-Day and Roach. Joker gains the upper hand when he picks up an AK-47, Deebo appears and knocks Joker out. Armed with Joker’s rifle, Deebo prepares to shoot but not before he is bitten by Chico. The police arrive and arrest the Joker brothers, Deebo, and Tyrone. Craig leaves with the Jokers' pump.

After witnessing D’Wana and Baby D toss a brick at Day-Day’s BMW, Craig returns home with his dad.

Cast

DJ Pooh, who previously portrayed Red in the first film, appears in an uncredited voice role as himself in the opening title sequence.

Chris Tucker was approached to return as Smokey, but he declined. This was covered up in Craig's opening narration which stated that Smokey checked in rehab one month ago.

Soundtrack

The film's soundtrack, which featured appearances from Aaliyah, Eminem, Bone Thugs-N-Harmony, Ice Cube, N.W.A., Snoop Dogg, Wu-Tang Clan, and Wyclef Jean, peaked at number five on the R&B/Hip-Hop charts, and nineteen on the Billboard 200 in 2000.

Release
In the United States, the film was released on Wednesday, January 12, 2000.

Home video
Next Friday was released on DVD format on June 6, 2000. The single disc DVD contains a theatrical trailer, music videos, a "making of..." featurette, behind the scenes footage, and an alternate ending as well as cast and crew information.

Reception

Box office
Next Friday grossed $14.5 million in its opening weekend in 1,103 theaters, averaging $13,114 per theater. The film grossed $57.3 million in North America and $2.5 million in the foreign box office, for a total of $59.8 million worldwide. The film is the most successful in the franchise.

Critical response
On Rotten Tomatoes, the film holds an approval rating of 21% based on 66 reviews with an average rating of  4.1/10. The website's critical consensus reads, "Next Friday lacks the fun of the original Friday. The movie is messy and plotless and relies on unfunny vulgar gags." On Metacritic, the film received a weighted average score of 41 based on 25 critics, indicating "mixed or average reviews". Audiences polled by CinemaScore gave the film an average grade of "B+" on an A+ to F scale.

Awards
 2000 MTV Movie Awards
 Best Comedic Performance — Ice Cube (nominated)

References

External links
 
 
 
 

2000 films
American crime comedy films
American buddy comedy films
American sequel films
Friday (franchise)
New Line Cinema films
American films about cannabis
Hood comedy films
2000s hip hop films
Cube Vision films
Films scored by Terence Blanchard
Films directed by Steve Carr
Films produced by Ice Cube
Films with screenplays by Ice Cube
African-American comedy films
2000s crime comedy films
2000s buddy comedy films
2000 directorial debut films
2000 comedy films
2000s English-language films
2000s American films
African-American films